The 1991 Uttlesford District Council election took place on 2 May 1991 to elect members of Uttlesford District Council in England. This was on the same day as other local elections.

Summary

|}

References

Uttlesford
Uttlesford District Council elections
1990s in Essex